Eugene Hernandez (born October 8, 1968) is an American journalist and non-profit executive. He is a co-founder of the online entertainment publication IndieWire and served as its editor in chief until 2010. Hernandez is currently the Director of the New York Film Festival,  
Deputy Executive Director of Film at Lincoln Center (previously known as the Film Society of Lincoln Center) and Publisher of Film Comment. In 2014 he was named to the OUT 100 list as one of the top 100 influential people in LGBT community. In 2015 Hernandez was selected as a juror at the annual Sundance Film Festival. He was named Sundance's festival director in 2022; the 2024 edition of the festival will be the first under his watch.

References

External links 

 Eugene Hernandez on Twitter
Eugene Hernandez on Instagram

American male journalists
Living people
1968 births
American LGBT journalists
20th-century American journalists